Parkia parvifoliola is a species of flowering plant in the family Fabaceae that is endemic to Palau.

References

parvifoliola
Endemic flora of Palau
Vulnerable plants
Taxonomy articles created by Polbot